Hebe  (minor planet designation: 6 Hebe) is a large main-belt asteroid, containing around 0.5% of the mass of the belt. However, due to its apparently high bulk density (greater than that of the Moon or even Mars), Hebe does not rank among the top twenty asteroids by volume. This high bulk density suggests an extremely solid body that has not been impacted by collisions, which is not typical of asteroids of its size – they tend to be loosely-bound rubble piles.

In brightness, Hebe is the fifth-brightest object in the asteroid belt after Vesta, Ceres, Iris, and Pallas. It has a mean opposition magnitude of +8.3, about equal to the mean brightness of Titan, and can reach +7.5 at an opposition near perihelion.

Hebe may be the parent body of the H chondrite meteorites, which account for about 40% of all meteorites striking Earth.

History
Hebe was discovered on 1 July 1847 by Karl Ludwig Hencke, the sixth asteroid discovered. It was the second and final asteroid discovery by Hencke, after 5 Astraea. The name Hebe, goddess of youth, was proposed by Carl Friedrich Gauss at Hencke's request. Gauss chose a wineglass as its symbol.

Potential as major meteorite source

Hebe was once thought to be the probable parent body of the H chondrite meteorites and the IIE iron meteorites.  This would imply that it is the source of about 40% of all meteorites striking Earth. Evidence for this connection includes the following:
 The spectrum of Hebe matches a mix of 60% H chondrite and 40% IIE iron meteorite material.
 The IIE type are unusual among the iron meteorites, and probably formed from impact melt, rather than being fragments of the core of a differentiated asteroid.
 The IIE irons and H chondrites likely come from the same parent body, due to similar trace mineral and oxygen isotope ratios.
 Asteroids with spectra similar to the ordinary chondrite meteorites (accounting for 85% of all falls, including the H chondrites) are extremely rare.
 6 Hebe is extremely well placed to send impact debris to Earth-crossing orbits. Ejecta with even relatively small velocities (~280 m/s) can enter the chaotic regions of the 3:1 Kirkwood gap at 2.50 AU and the nearby  secular resonance which determines the high-inclination edge of the asteroid belt at about 16°  inclinations hereabouts.
 Of the asteroids in this "well-placed" orbit, Hebe is the largest.
 An analysis of likely contributors to Earth's meteorite flux places 6 Hebe at the top of the list, due to its position and relatively large size.

However, observations by the VLT in 2017 indicate that the depressions caused by impacts on 6 Hebe are only 20% the volume of the nearby H-chondrite asteroid families, suggesting the Hebe is not the most likely or primary source of H-chondrite meteorites.

Physical characteristics

Lightcurve analysis suggests that Hebe has a rather angular shape, which may be due to several large impact craters. Hebe rotates in a prograde direction, with the north pole pointing towards ecliptic coordinates (β, λ) = (45°, 339°)  with a 10° uncertainty. This gives an axial tilt of 42°.

It has a bright surface and, if its identification as the parent body of the H chondrites is correct, a
surface composition of silicate chondritic rocks mixed with pieces of iron–nickel. A likely scenario for the formation of the surface metal is as follows:
 Large impacts caused local melting of the iron rich H chondrite surface. The metals, being heavier, would have settled to the bottom of the magma lake, forming a metallic layer buried by a relatively shallow layer of silicates.
 Later sizeable impacts broke up and mixed these layers.
 Small frequent impacts tend to preferentially pulverize the weaker rocky debris, leading to an increased concentration of the larger metal fragments at the surface, such that they eventually comprise ~40% of the immediate surface at the present time.

Orbit

On 5 March 1977 Hebe occulted Kaffaljidhma (γ Ceti), a moderately bright 3rd-magnitude star. Between 1977 and 2021, 6 Hebe has been observed to occult fourteen stars.

Possible moon
As a result of the aforementioned 1977 occultation, a small moon around Hebe was reported by Paul D. Maley. It was nicknamed "Jebe" (see heebie-jeebies). This was the first modern-day suggestion that asteroids have satellites. It was 17 years later when the first asteroid moon was formally discovered (Dactyl, the satellite of 243 Ida). The discovery of Hebe's moon was never confirmed.

Detailed observations by many telescopes including the Very Large Telescope and the Hubble Space Telescope have consistently failed to detect any satellites around the asteroid, casting doubt on such a moon existing.

See also
 Former classification of planets

Notes

References

External links
 shape model deduced from lightcurve
 MNRAS 7 (1847) 283 (discovery announcement)
 MNRAS 8 (1848) 103
 JPL Ephemeris
 
 

Background asteroids
Hebe
Hebe
S-type asteroids (Tholen)
S-type asteroids (SMASS)
18470701
Objects observed by stellar occultation